Montsame is the official state-owned news agency of Mongolia. It was founded in 1921. It has permanent correspondents in Ulaanbaatar, Mongolian aimag centers, Beijing, and Moscow.

International cooperation
The news agency has cooperation agreements with Information Telegraph Agency of Russia, Reuters, Xinhua, Yonhap, Vietnam News Agency, Prensa Latina, Polish Press Agency, Bulgarian News Agency, Anadolu Agency, Ukrinform, Voice of America, Azerbaijan State Telegraph Agency, Kazinform, Mehr News Agency, and Korean Central News Agency.

Publications

Mongolian
www.montsame.mn - Website
МОНЦАМЭ Мэдээ (MONTSAME medee) - Weekly outline of Mongolia-related news around the world
МОНЦАМЭ Тойм (MONTSAME toim) - Monthly magazine
 (Khümüün bichig) - Weekly newspaper in Mongolian script

Foreign language
MONTSAME Daily News,MONTSAME Novostii - Daily newsletter in Russian
MONTA tele studi - Daily Mongolia related videos in English
Новости Монголии (Novosti Mongolii) - Weekly newspaper in Russian
Mongol Messenger - Weekly newspaper in English
蒙古消息报 (Menggu xiaoxibao) - Weekly newspaper in China
モンゴル通信 (Mongoru Tsuushin) - Weekly newspaper in Japan
Mongolia Today - seasonal magazine in English
Mongolia - yearly booklet in English

See also
 Media of Mongolia

References

External links
 

News agencies based in Mongolia
Mass media companies established in 1921
Multilingual news services
1921 establishments in Mongolia